The Flag Officer, Third Flotilla was the senior Royal Navy appointment in command of the Third Flotilla from 1979 to 1992.

The Western Fleet and Far East Fleet were merged into the single Commander-in-Chief Fleet in 1971. He had three new seagoing subordinates: Flag Officer First Flotilla, Second Flotilla and Flag Officer, Carriers and Amphibious Ships (FOCAS) each commanded by a rear admiral. In December 1979 the post of FOCAS was re-named Flag Officer, Third Flotilla (FOF3). 

From 1981-1992 the Flag Officer Third Flotilla commanded the aircraft carriers; amphibious Ships; the Fleet Training Ship; and destroyers not allocated to First or Second Flotillas. 

In April 1992, the Third Flotilla was abolished, and the remaining two flotilla commanders became Flag Officer, Surface Flotilla - responsible for operational readiness and training and Commander United Kingdom Task Group (COMUKTG), who would command any deployed task group.

Flag Officers commanding

Included:
 Rear-Admiral Peter G.M. Herbert: November 1979-December 1979
 Vice-Admiral Sir John M.H. Cox: December 1979 – 1981
 Vice-Admiral Sir John M.H. Cox: December 1981-March 1982
 Rear-Admiral Derek R. Reffell: March 1982-August 1983
 Vice-Admiral Sir Richard G.A. Fitch: August 1983-October 1985
 Vice-Admiral Sir J.Julian R. Oswald: October 1985-April 1987
 Rear-Admiral Hugo M. White: April 1987-October 1988
 Vice-Admiral Sir Alan Grose: October 1988-March 1990
 Vice-Admiral the Hon. Sir Nicholas J. Hill-Norton: March 1990-April 1992

Notes

References 
 Mackie, Colin (2018). "Royal Navy Senior Appointments from 1865" (PDF). gulabin.com. Colin Mackie. Scotland, UK.
 Roberts, John (2009). Safeguarding the Nation: The Story of the Modern Royal Navy. Barnsley, England: Seaforth Publishing. .
 Smith, Gordon (2015). "Royal Navy Organisation and Ship Deployment 1947-2013: Fleet Oorganisation, 1981-2002".

 

T
Royal Navy flotillas
Military units and formations established in 1979
Military units and formations disestablished in 1992